The 2018 J.League Cup (2018 Jリーグカップ), or officially the 2018 J.League YBC Levain Cup (2018 JリーグYBCルヴァンカップ), is the 43rd edition of the Japanese football league cup tournament and the 26th edition under the current J. League Cup format.

The winners earned the right to play against the winners of the 2018 Copa Sudamericana in the 2019 J.League Cup / Copa Sudamericana Championship.

Format

Byes
Teams that qualified for 2018 AFC Champions League group stage (3 or 4 teams) are given byes to the quarterfinals.
Group stage
The group stage is played by 16 teams, consisting of all other 2018 J1 League participants (14 or 15 teams) plus top 1 or 2 2018 J2 League participants based on the ranking of the previous season (i.e., 16th-placed team, and 17th-placed team if applicable, of 2017 J1 League).
Play-off stage
Play-off stage is played as four or five two-legged ties (number depending on the number of teams given byes to the quarterfinals so that eight teams play the quarterfinals).
 If four teams are given byes to the quarterfinals, eight teams (top two teams of each group) advances to the play-off stage and composes four ties.
 If three teams are given byes to the quarterfinals, ten teams (top two teams of each group, plus two best third-placed teams among four groups) advances to the play-off stage and composes five ties.

After the play-off stage where eight teams are active, quarterfinals (two-legged), semi finals (two-legged) and the final (single match) are played.

Group stage
Played between March 7 & May 16.

Tiebreakers

To determine the ranking of a group, teams with the same points are ranked by the following criteria:

 Points in the matches between the teams in question,
 Goal differences in the matches between the teams in question,
 Number of goals in the matches between the teams in question,
 Number of away goals in the matches between the teams in question.
 In case there are still two or more tied teams by the criteria above, re-apply them for only the tied teams. If the process does not classify teams anymore, see the following criteria.
 Goal differences in all group matches,
 Number of goals in all group matches,
 Penalty shoot-out (only if just two teams are tied, and they play the last group match)
 Fewer disciplinary points,
 Drawing of lots.

To determine the best third-placed teams (if needed), teams with the same points are ranked by the following criteria:

 Goal differences in all group matches,
 Number of goals in all group matches,
 Fewer disciplinary points,
 Drawing of lots.

Group A

Group B

Group C

Group D

Bracket

Play-off stage
In each tie (two-legged tie) of play-offs, quarterfinals or semifinals, away goals rule is applied for goals in the regular playing time, but not in the extra time.

Played on June 2 & 9.

|}

Quarterfinals
Played on September 5 & 9.

|}

First leg

Second leg

Semifinals
Played on October 10 & 14.

|}

First leg

Second leg

Final

Top goalscorers
.

References

External links
 Official site 

J.League Cup
2018 in Japanese football